Cicindela longilabris, the boreal long-lipped tiger beetle, is a species of flashy tiger beetle in the family Carabidae. It is found in North America.

Subspecies
These three subspecies belong to the species Cicindela longilabris:
 Cicindela longilabris laurentii Schaupp, 1884 (Laurent's long-lipped tiger beetle)
 Cicindela longilabris longilabris Say, 1824 (long-lipped tiger beetle)
 Cicindela longilabris perviridis Schaupp, 1884 (green long-lipped tiger beetle)

References

Further reading

 
 

longilabris
Articles created by Qbugbot
Beetles described in 1824